Gisheh may refer to:
 Gisheh, Kerman
 Gisheh, South Khorasan